France–Norway relations are foreign relations between France and Norway.

Both countries established diplomatic relations in 1905, after Norway's independence. Both countries are full members of NATO, and of the Council of Europe. There are around 2,000 Norwegian people living in France and around 3,571 French people living in Norway.

Both nations have Territorial claims in Antarctica, and mutually recognise each other's claims, as well as those from the United Kingdom, New Zealand and Australia.

Education 
There are two French international schools in Norway:
 Lycée Français René Cassin d'Oslo
 Lycée Français de Stavanger

Resident diplomatic missions
 France has an embassy in Oslo.
 Norway has an embassy in Paris.

See also 
 Foreign relations of France
 Foreign relations of Norway

References 

 

 
Norway
Bilateral relations of Norway